Asfastan or Asfestan may refer to:

Asfestan, East Azerbaijan
Asfastan, Qazvin